Lamphun Province Stadium  or Lamphun PAO. Stadium or Mae-Guang Stadium is a multi-purpose stadium in Lamphun province, Thailand. It is currently used mostly for football matches and is the home stadium of Lamphun Warriors F.C.

Multi-purpose stadiums in Thailand
Buildings and structures in Lamphun province
Sport in Lamphun province